A list of films produced by the Tollywood (Bengali language film industry) based in Kolkata in the year 1950.

A-Z of films

References

External links

1950
Lists of 1950 films by country or language
Films, Bengali